Eton, or Ìtón, is a Bantu language spoken by the Eton people of Cameroon.

It is mutually intelligible with Ewondo, a fact which may have delayed its study for some time.

Eton speakers inhabit the Lekié department of the Centre Region of Cameroon, an area north of the capital Yaoundé bounded in the north by the Sanaga River.

Ethnologue cites four dialects of Eton, but its speakers generally distinguish two, a northern and a southern dialect, the latter of which is closer to the Ewondo language.

The Mengisa people have largely switched to Eton. A small number continue to speak their ancestral language, Leti. It is not clear if the ISO code for "Mengisa" refers to Eton or Leti; Ethnologue classifies Mengisa with Eton, but the code is likely based on Guthrie, who classified it with Leti.

Phonology 
Eton is a tone language. It makes use of three tones (low, high and dissimilating high) and floating tones.

Grammar 
Eton is an SVO language. As is common in Bantu, Eton has a noun class system. There are twelve classes and the class of a noun determines which agreement prefix it receives and triggers. For instance, verbs agree with the subject's noun class.

References

Velde, Mark L. O. Van de. A Grammar of Eton, Mouton de Gruyter, 2008.

External links
Velde, Mark L. O. Van de. (PDF) A Description of Eton: Phonology, morphology, basic syntax and lexicon. Available through the Katholieke Universiteit Leuven website.
Materials on Eton are included in the open access Arthur Capell collection (AC2) held by Paradisec.

Beti languages
Languages of Cameroon